Poitiers Basket 86, also known as PB86 or simply Poitiers, is a French professional basketball team located in the city of Poitiers, in the Nouvelle-Aquitaine region, France. It competes in the French Pro B league. The club's home games are played at Salle de Saint-Eloi except for several matches played at Les Arênes. The players wear white and blue uniforms.

History
Poitiers Basket 86 was founded in 2004, following the merging of two teams - CEP Poitiers and Stade Poitevin. The club began its first season in Nationale 3 with Grégory Thiélin as head coach and ranked at a promising 5th place at the end of the season. The following year, the team was promoted to the LNB Pro B, making it the first team ever from Poitiers to play at a professional level. The 2006/2007 season was difficult for the team which finished 13th.

During the 2007/2008 season, Ruddy Nelhomme was named head coach. He kept the following French players (Costentin, Devéhat, Gomez, Guillard, Maynier) and recruited two Americans from Brest (Younger and Gunn), the experimented Thomas Darnauzan and some young players from the under-20 team (Kanté, Florimont, Dienepo, Dalmat).

In salle Lawson Body, Poitiers began its second season with the ambition of doing well in its second professional season. At the end of the regular season, the team finished third and gained access to the playoffs but eventually lost in the final against Besançon.

In the 2008/2009 season, Poitiers qualified for the playoffs once again, by finishing second during the regular season. The team won the Final against Limoges and was promoted to Pro A.

The team's first year in LNB Pro A was a success. It won its first match away against Nancy. At the end of the regular season, Poitiers beat ASVEL and became the last team to enter the playoffs. For the first time ever, the defending champion didn't qualify for the playoffs. Unfortunately, the club was eliminated during the quarterfinals by Cholet, the season's champion. At the end of the match, Sylvain Maynier announced the end of his career.
During the 2010/2011 season, Poitiers eventually stayed in Pro A following a victory against Hyères-Toulon in the last match of the season. The team finished at the 14th place with 12 wins and 18 defeats.

For the 2011/2012 season, JJ Miller joined the team.

Ruddy Nelhomme was elected best coach of Pro B during the 2008/2009 season and best coach of Pro A the following year. He was then named Assistant Coach for the French basketball team during the World Championship in Turkey and for the EuroBasket 2011, where France reached the final.

Poitiers Basket is known for its innovative communication, becoming the first sport club to create a TV show (Vis mon Match), broadcast on the website of the team. Several thousands of people watched the show which was then shown in a movie theater for two days. Poitiers fans have been elected the most fair-play of Pro A three times in a row.

Season by season

Arenas
The club plays its domestic matches at Salle Saint-Eloi (2,700 seats). However, some matches are held at Les Arênes and allows for a larger audience (4,800 seats).

Roster

Head coaches

Notable players

Honours
LNB Pro B
Winners (1): 2008–09 
Nationale Masculine 1
Winners (1): 2005–06

References

External links
Official Website 
Eurobasket.com Team Page
Webshow "Vis mon match" 

Basketball teams established in 2004
Poitiers
Sport in Poitiers